Fred C. Fishback (born Moscu Fischback; January 18, 1894January 6, 1925) was a film director, actor, screenwriter, and producer of the silent era. Following the 1921 scandal surrounding Roscoe Arbuckle, in which he was involved, Fishback worked mostly under the pseudonym Fred Hibbard.

Biography
Fred Fishback was born Moscu Fischback (sometimes spelled Fischbach) on January 18, 1894, in Bucharest, Romania. He immigrated to the United States around 1900, and made his motion picture debut with Thomas H. Ince in 1912. As Freddy Fischbach, he became a cameraman at Mack Sennett's Keystone studio, where he worked with comedy star Roscoe Arbuckle. Sennett promoted Fischbach to director, with his surname Americanized to Fred Fishback.

Anyone with Keystone credentials was welcomed by lesser comedy studios, and Fishback secured a job directing comedy shorts for Universal Pictures, many of them featuring former Keystone and Hal Roach bit player Lige Conley.

Both Arbuckle and Fishback were hired to direct at Educational Pictures. Fishback, reunited with Lige Conley, helped to develop Conley into a comedy star in a lengthy series of slapstick short subjects. Fishback also directed one of Educational's leading comedians, Lloyd Hamilton. Fishback died at the age of 30 of cancer; his last films were released posthumously.

Select filmography

Actor

Director

References

External links

1894 births
1925 deaths
Deaths from lung cancer in California
Romanian emigrants to the United States
American film directors
American male screenwriters
American film producers
20th-century American male writers
20th-century American screenwriters